Naseer Shamma is an Iraqi musician and oud player.

He was born in 1963 in Kut, a city on the Tigris River. He began studying the oud at the age of 12 in Baghdad, following in the footsteps of Jamil and Munir Bashir. He received his diploma from the Baghdad Academy of Music in 1987. He began to teach oud after three years at the academy, as well as continuing his own studies. Shamma has composed music for films, plays and television and created the Arabic Oud House.

Among other recognitions, Shamma has been distinguished as UNESCO Artist for Peace and by the International Red Crescent and Red Cross Societies as goodwill ambassador.

Discography
 Le Luth de Bagdad (1994, Institut du Monde Arabe) (reissued as Le Luth de Bagdad - Histoire d’amour orientale)
 Ishraq (1996, Musicaimmagine)
 The Moon Fades (1999, Incognito)
 If Found (2004, Diwan)
 Maqamat Ziryáb (2005, Pneuma)
 Hilal (Crescent) (2006, Pneuma)
 Ard Al-Sawad (The Black Land or Land of Darkness) (2006, Diwan)
 Viaje De Las Almas (Travelling Souls) (2011, Pneuma)

Cassettes
 Before I Get Crucified (1997)
 The Night of Baghdad (1997)
 Eastern Love Story (1997)
 Declaring My Love Silently (1997)
 For the Children of Iraq (1997)
  The Siege of Baghdad (2000)

Other
 Oud Naseer Shamma (2000, Abu Dhabi Cultural Foundation) 
 The Fire This Time (2002, Hidden Art)
 Silk (2008, Abu Dhabi Festival)

See also 

Arabic Lute House
List of Iraqi artists 
Munir Bashir, contemporary Iraqi Oud musician.
Kadim Al Sahir, an Iraqi singer, composer and songwriter.

References

External links
Arab Oud House bio
Naseer Shamma: the musician, concerts, interviews

1963 births
Living people
20th-century Iraqi poets
Iraqi oud players
Iraqi Shia Muslims
People from Kut
21st-century Iraqi poets